San Marcos is a department in northwestern Guatemala, on the Pacific Ocean and along the western Guatemala-Mexico border.

The department's capital is the city of San Marcos.

History

Colonial period
The Spanish conquest of Guatemalan Highlands occurred in the 1520s, followed by the establishment of the Province of Tecusitlán and Lacandón within the Viceroyalty of New Spain.  Candacuchex, a settlement of the Mayan Mam people, became the site of the city of San Marcos, established in 1533.

In 1546, once the Guatemalan archdiocese was established, bishop Francisco Marroquín split the ecclesiastical duties in the region among the Order of Preachers, Franciscans and Mercedarians, being the latter appointed to take care of "El Barrio" (in present-day San Marcos and Huehuetenango Departments), which was then a part of the Province of Quetzaltenango]. In 1609 the Captaincy General of Guatemala was established.

In 1690, the Tejutla "curato" had a large area and included the modern municipalities of Comitancillo, Ixchiguán, Concepción Tutuapa, Sipacapa, Sibinal, Tajumulco, Tacaná and part of what is now San Miguel Ixtahuacán. According to the historical writings from Recordación Florida of Francisco Antonio de Fuentes y Guzmán, Tejutla belonged to Quetzaltenango Department and it was a "prosperous land with rich weathers and comfortable forest with enough water".

Tejutla was an important commercial and religious center; in August 1767, Joseph Domingo Hidalgo described Santiago Tejutla as "El Curato" -i.e., the focal center of commerce of all the towns that were around it− in the Gaceta de Guatemala, the official newspaper of the times.  Then, in the last quarter of the 18th century, bishop Dr. Pedro Cortés y Larraz, who arrived from Cuilco in 1770 as part of the inspection he was doing of the Guatemalan dioceses, called Tejutla "Santiago en la Cima del Monte" (English: Santiago at the top of the hill" and reported that there were "sixty four families who lived very well" in the area.

In 1754 the Mercedarians gave away their convent to the secular clergy per the Borbonic reforms that were instituted by the King of Spain, and Tejutla became a secular "curato".

Independence
The Act of Independence of Central America was issued in 1821. The Provincial Council of the Province of Guatemala within the Captaincy General of Guatemala proclaimed the independence of Central America from the Spanish Empire. After being annexed by the First Mexican Empire in 1821, the Federal Republic of Central America was founded in 1823, which included the present day San Marcos region of Guatemala.

The department was created by a governmental decree on 8 May 1866, together with Huehuetenango, Izabal and Petén departments.   In 1902 the eruption of the Santa María volcano in the neighbouring department of Quetzaltenango was responsible for the destruction of the twin towns of San Marcos and San Pedro Sacatepéquez. The towns were rebuilt and in 1935 were joined to form the new municipality of San Marcos La Unión. This new municipality did not last long and the unified municipalities were again split in 1945 with San Marcos remaining the departmental capital.

21st century
Towards the end of the 20th century, San Marcos became a hot spot for drug trafficking in Central America, and one of the top lords was Juan Chamalé Ortiz, who was heavily involved in cocaine trafficking, and was accused by US authorities of helping to move over 40 tons of cocaine through Central America en route to the United States. Ortiz worked with local fishermen to smuggle cocaine in small fishing boats and may have also commissioned semi-submersibles to transport the drug. Ortiz also controlled a major opium poppy producing area, the San Marcos Department, where he was a popular local figure. He owned at least ten estates in his area of operations, including a large farm in Malacatán and provided numerous jobs, in addition to cultivating local support by throwing parties and sponsoring beauty contests.

San Marcos is one of the most important regions in Guatemala given its proximity to the highlands, Mexico, and to the Pacific Ocean coast, where most of the drugs coming from South America land. Ortiz exerted influence over local politicians and police in the region, and relied on a powerful local support network to conduct his business. He is thought to have worked out a deal that made him the Sinaloa Cartel's top transporter, helping the Mexican group move drugs that arrived via Pacific routes.  Ortiz Chamalé was captured in 2011 in Quetzaltenango and extradited to the United States in 2014 where he was sentenced to 262 months in jail; when Ortiz was arrested in 2011, locals protested to demand his release.

Geography

San Marcos is bordered on the northeast by the department of Huehuetenango, on the east by the department of Quetzaltenango, to the south by the department of Retalhuleu and by the Pacific Ocean, and on the west by the Mexican state of Chiapas.

The northern portion of the department is mountainous, being crossed by the Sierra Madre de Chiapas mountain range. The two highest volcanoes in Central America being located within its borders,  Tajumulco ( high) and Tacaná ( high). The Tajumulco volcano is the highest peak in Central America. The southern portion of the department drops away towards the Pacific coast.

The Tacaná volcano, which occupies the border with Mexico and has slopes in both countries, has been historically active, with activity recorded in 1855, 1878, from 1900 through to 1903, from 1949 to 1950 and from 1986 to 1987.

Principal rivers in the department include the Suchiate River, which marks the border between San Marcos and Chiapas, Mexico, and flows into the Pacific Ocean. The Cabuz River has its source on the slopes of the Tajumulco volcano. Other rivers include the El Pajapa, El Rodeo, Ixlamá, Ixtal, Meléndrez, Nahuatán, Tilapa, and Ocosito Rivers.

The climate varies widely within the department, due to the dramatic differences in altitude, with the north possessing a cold Guatemalan Highlands climate and the south having a temperate or hot climate, depending on the specific altitude.

Population
The 2018 census recorded the total population of San Marcos department as 1,032,277. Languages spoken in the department include Spanish, Mam and Sipakapense.

Economy and agriculture

The wide variety of climates within the department resulting from differences in altitude gives rise to a variety of agricultural products. Agricultural products include apples, bananas, barley, beans, cacao, coffee, maize, oats, peaches, plantains, potatoes, rice, sugarcane and wheat. Livestock include cattle, horses and sheep. San Marcos department produces more wool than any other department of Guatemala. It is generally exported to the departments of Quetzaltenango and Totonicapán, where it is processed into finished products. The department produces wooden furniture, with production being concentrated in the Pacific lowlands due to the greater variety of wood available, including cedar, ceiba and tepemixte.

The department is notable for the importation of black market Mexican products, which are sold openly in local markets throughout its territory and from there are exported throughout Guatemala.

Municipalities
The department of San Marcos is divided into 30 municipalities:

Tourism

The main tourist attractions of the San Marcos department are its various Pacific beaches and the Tacaná and Tajumulco volcanoes. Other attractions include thermal baths and the caves of Castalia.

Notes and references

Citations

Bibliography

 
Departments of Guatemala